John Edward Parris (31 January 1911 – 27 February 1971) was a Welsh international footballer, who played for Bradford Park Avenue, Bournemouth & Boscombe Athletic, Luton Town, Bath City, Northampton Town and Cheltenham Town.  He was the first black player to represent Wales in an international, and over his career between 1927 and 1948 made 268 league appearances and scored 60 goals.

Life
He was born in Ivy Cottage, Pwllmeyric, Chepstow, Monmouthshire, Wales, to a white mother, Annie Alford (nee Clarke) from Leicester, England, and a black father, John Edward Parris (known as Eddie), who had been born in Barbados but moved to England in about 1900.

From 1927, aged 16, Eddie Parris played for Chepstow Town F.C.  His talents were spotted by scouts for Bradford Park Avenue A.F.C., at the time a leading club, and he was signed as a trialist in 1928.  He made his debut in January 1929, scoring his team's only goal in a drawn F.A. Cup match against Hull, and thereafter established a regular first-team place at left wing. In his career at Bradford Park Avenue, he played 142 League and Cup games and scored 39 goals.

In December 1931 Parris made his first and only appearance for Wales against Ireland in Belfast, becoming the first black player to represent Wales in an international. Although sometimes cited as the first black player to play for any of the 'home countries', research now suggests that in fact the first was the Scotland player Andrew Watson.

In 1932 the Daily Mail wrote of him: 'Parris is speedy, has ball control, and is not a little football genius'.  He suffered an injury in 1934, and later played for Bournemouth & Boscombe Athletic (1934–37), Luton, Northampton, Bath City, Cheltenham Town and Gloucester City.  His final recorded match, as player-coach at Gloucester City, was in 1948.

He also worked in a munitions factory and, from 1939, for the Gloster Aircraft Company in Brockworth.  He lived at Sedbury near Chepstow, and in Gloucester, where he died in 1971.

Significance and legacy

Historian Martin Johnes of Swansea University studied Parris in order to explore black working-class experiences in early and mid 20th century Britain. Most people of colour left few historical traces but as a professional footballer, Parris was discussed in the press. Johnes shows that newspaper often described Parris in racial terms, but any overt racism Parris faced was not recorded. Nonetheless, given the racial attitudes of the time, Parris must have faced prejudices and the frequent references to his race in match reports and the like shows that people of colour were regarded as different in British culture.

A plaque to honour Parris was installed outside his birthplace in Pwllmeyric in 2021.

References

External links
Article with photo of Eddie Parris
Bantamspast.co.uk - "Eddie Parris: A Welsh Pioneer"

1911 births
1971 deaths
Welsh footballers
AFC Bournemouth players
Bradford (Park Avenue) A.F.C. players
Luton Town F.C. players
Bath City F.C. players
Northampton Town F.C. players
Cheltenham Town F.C. players
Gloucester City A.F.C. players
Wales international footballers
People from Chepstow
Sportspeople from Monmouthshire
Black British sportspeople
Welsh people of English descent
Welsh people of Barbadian descent
British sportspeople of Barbadian descent
People from Tidenham
Association football midfielders
Chepstow Town F.C. players